Leszek Sułek (born 18 April 1954 in Piotrowice near Zawichost) is a Polish politician. He was elected to the Sejm on 25 September 2005, getting 7590 votes in 33 Kielce district as a candidate from the Samoobrona Rzeczpospolitej Polskiej list.

See also
 Members of Polish Sejm 2005-2007

External links
 Leszek Sułek - parliamentary page - includes declarations of interest, voting record, and transcripts of speeches.

1954 births
Living people
People from Sandomierz County
Members of the Polish Sejm 2005–2007
Self-Defence of the Republic of Poland politicians